Swiss Air-Rescue (German: Schweizerische Rettungsflugwacht, French: Garde aérienne suisse de sauvetage, Italian: Guardia aerea svizzera di soccorso, Rega) is a private, non-profit air rescue service that provides emergency medical assistance in Switzerland and Liechtenstein.  Rega was founded on 27 April 1952 by Rudolf Bucher, who believed that the Swiss rescue service needed a specialized air branch. Rega mainly assists in mountain rescues, but also operates in other terrains when necessary, especially in life-threatening emergencies. Rega also provides a repatriation and medical advice service for members who experience a medical emergency while abroad and local treatment is not available.

Rega also aids alpine farmers during the summer months in rescuing livestock and retrieving dead animals.

As a non-profit foundation, Rega does not receive financial assistance from any government. They are quite unusual within Europe, with the majority of their costs paid through the annual fees of private contributors (As of 2016: 3.2 million patrons, 38% of the population). In exchange, Rega does not charge its contributors for its search, rescue and repatriation costs. One other rare aspect of Rega is that people in distress can call for a helicopter rescue directly (phone number 1414). In case of insufficient mobile phone coverage, alpinists can also use emergency radio telephone (161.3 MHz).

The head office, the Rega Centre, (home to the Rega operations center where all missions are coordinated) is a hangar located at the northeast section of Zurich Airport within the municipality of Kloten; the hangar has direct access to the runways of the airport. All Rega helicopters carry a crew of three: a pilot, an emergency physician, and a paramedic who is also trained to assist the pilot for radio communication, navigation, terrain/object avoidance, and winch operations. In some situations, such as evacuating cable cars or retrieving injured climbers from a rock face, the crew also consists of a specialist trained by the Swiss Alpine Club.

In the Canton of Valais, helicopter search and rescue is carried out by Air Glaciers and Air Zermatt

Name 

The name Rega was created by combining letters from the name "Swiss Air Rescue Guard" as it was written in German (Schweizerische Rettungsflugwacht), French (Garde Aérienne Suisse de Sauvetage), and Italian (Guardia Aerea Svizzera di Soccorso). The decision to change the name was made in 1979, to create a uniform and more concise name for speakers of the three languages.

Fleet
Helicopters
 8 Airbus Helicopters H145, used in the lowlands and the Jura mountains
 11 Agusta A109 SP Grand "Da Vinci", used in the Alps
 1 Airbus Helicopters H125, since end of  2016 for training flights 
Transports
 3 Bombardier CL-650 "Challenger", stationed at Zurich Airport

Orders
 The 3 Challenger CL 604 will be replaced in 2018 with 3 Challenger 650. Two CL604 will be sold to the Swiss Air Force.
 Six Airbus Helicopters H145 should replace the EC145 fleet. The first H145 should arrive in spring 2018.

Bases and their locations 
 Rega Center (operations headquarters) at Zurich Airport LSZH
Dübendorf LSMD AFB (Rega 1), Dübendorf Air Base
Basel LFSB (Rega 2), EuroAirport Basel Mulhouse Freiburg, France
Bern LSZB (Rega 3), Bern-Belp Airport
Lausanne LSGL (Rega 4)
Untervaz LSXU (Rega 5)
Locarno LSMO AFB (Rega 6) at Locarno Airport LSZL
St. Gallen (Rega 7)
Erstfeld LSXE (Rega 8)
Samedan LSZS (Rega 9)
Wilderswil/Interlaken LSXI (Rega 10)
Mollis LSMF (Rega 12)
Zweisimmen (Rega 14)
Geneva LSGG (Rega 15), Geneva Airport. This base uses an EC-135 belonging to the University Hospital of Geneva, but is operated on behalf of Rega.

Pilots 
Ursula Bühler Hedinger, first woman from Switzerland to hold a license to fly a jet and the first Swiss female flight instructor flew for REGA for over 25 years.

Partners
Rega work closely with several organizations and emergency services including the police, fire and ambulance services. It assists in rescue efforts related to road accidents with the Touring Club Suisse TCS. For alpine search, rescue and recovery operations, Rega works closely with rescue branch of the Swiss Alpine Club. For larger operations, Rega may request additional helicopters from the FOCA or the Swiss Accident Investigation Board (SAIB, German acronym SUST) (formerly Aircraft Accident Investigation Bureau).

Rega is a partner of the Swiss Air Force, which supports Rega with helicopters and personnel when necessary. For search-and-rescue flights in difficult conditions, the Air Force has a FLIR-equipped helicopter (usually Eurocopter AS332 Super Puma or Cougar) on call. The Air Force continually monitors the airspace and directs emergency signals immediately to Rega. Aircraft equipment of the Swiss Air Force is used to gain a rapid and precise location of an emergency signal that is transmitted to the Rega helicopter early in an emergency mission. Rega also has access to the Air Force radio system for comprehensive radio coverage, which has a larger coverage area than civil aviation radio.

References

External links

 Rega (English homepage)
 Swiss-SAR (Oversight agency)

Air ambulance services in Switzerland
Airlines of Switzerland
Airlines established in 1952